Suliana Manley (born 1975) is an American biophysicist. Her research focuses on the development of high-resolution optical instruments, and their application in studying the organization and dynamics of proteins. She is a professor at École Polytechnique Fédérale de Lausanne and heads the Laboratory of Experimental Biophysics.

Career 
Manley studied physics and mathematics at Rice University where she received a Bachelor’s degree (cum laude) in 1997. She joined Harvard University and in 2004 graduated with a PhD in physics under the supervision of Dave A. Weitz. She then went to work as a postdoctoral researcher on lipid bilayer and red blood cell membrane dynamics with Alice P. Gast at MIT. In 2006,  she joined the cell biology laboratory of Jennifer Lippincott-Schwartz at the National Institutes of Health as post-doctoral fellow. Here she developed an optical method (sptPALM) enabling the study of the dynamics of large ensembles of single proteins in membranes and inside cells.

In 2009, she became an assistant professor of physics at the École Polytechnique Fédérale de Lausanne, and was promoted to associate professor in 2016 and to full professor in 2022. She is the founding director of the Laboratory of Experimental Biophysics.

Recognition 
In 2019, Manley was awarded the Medal for Innovation in Light Microscopy by Royal Microscopical Society. In 2020, she was elected as an APS (American Physical Society) fellow.

Research 

Manley's research group is invested in the field of high-resolution optical instruments and in the investigation of complex biological systems. They develop and deploy automated super-resolution fluorescence imaging techniques combined with live cell imaging and single molecule tracking. Their aim is to determine both the dynamics and the spatial distribution of protein assembly. They are also interested in the information transduction across cell membranes and therefore investigate the assembly dynamics of membrane-bound receptor.

Their main research topics involve:
 High-throughput and large field-of-view single molecule localization microscopies (SMLM) by application of microlens array (MLA)-based flat-field epi-illumination.
 Multicolor 3D single particle reconstruction from multicolor 2D SMLM images.
 Waveguide TIRF for high-throughput DNA-PAINT for better precision of target localization and continuous target sampling.
 Study of the physical and physiological signatures of mitochondria division and fusion.

Publication 

 
 
 
 
 
 Patterson, George, Michael Davidson, Suliana Manley, and Jennifer Lippincott-Schwartz. "Superresolution imaging using single-molecule localization." Annual review of physical chemistry 61 (2010): 345-367. Doi:10.1146/annurev.physchem.012809.103444

References

External links 

 Laboratory of Experimental Biophysics
 

Academic staff of the École Polytechnique Fédérale de Lausanne
Rice University alumni
1975 births
Living people
American women scientists
Harvard University alumni
American biophysicists
Fellows of the American Physical Society
American women academics
21st-century American women